Jasmine Blocker (born June 9, 1992) is an American athlete. She competed in the mixed 4 × 400 metres relay event at the 2019 World Athletics Championships, winning the gold medal.

References

External links
 

1992 births
Living people
American female sprinters
Place of birth missing (living people)
World Athletics Championships athletes for the United States
World Athletics Championships medalists
World Athletics Championships winners
21st-century American women